Shelly Mountain is a mountain in Custer County, Idaho, in the White Knob Mountains. At 3439m (11,283 ft), it is the 13th highest peak with at least 500m of prominence in Idaho.

References 

Mountains of Idaho
Mountains of Custer County, Idaho